The Shaolin Temple (少林寺) is a 1982 Chinese–Hong Kong martial arts film directed by Chang Hsin Yen and starring Jet Li in his debut role (credited as Jet Lee in the film) along with Ding Lan and Yu Hai in supporting roles. The film is based on the Shaolin Monastery in China and depicts Shaolin Kung Fu. The film was among the first major co-productions between Hong Kong and mainland China, and the first to be filmed in mainland China with a mostly mainland cast. The film's plot has an episodic storytelling structure while combining action, comedy and romance elements.

It was the first martial arts film to be made in mainland China after the founding of the People's Republic of China; up until then, kung fu films and wuxia films were mostly made in Hong Kong and Taiwan. It was also the first film to be shot at the Shaolin Monastery. It sold an estimated  tickets at the Chinese box office, and is estimated to be China's highest-grossing film ever when adjusted for inflation. The film's success established Jet Li as the first Mainland Chinese star of Hong Kong, and later Hollywood. It was also largely responsible for turning the Shaolin Monastery into a major tourist destination, both within China and internationally. A remake of the film was released in 2011 titled Shaolin and starred Andy Lau, Nicholas Tse and Jackie Chan.

Plot

The film is set in Medieval China during the transition period between the Sui dynasty (581–618) and the Tang dynasty (618–907). Inside the Shaolin Temple, the novice Jue Yuan (Jet Li) bows before the Abbot. He is about to be accepted as a monk. The Abbot tells Jue Yuan that he must vow to not commit murder. Jue Yuan is silent. The Abbot repeats the question, and Jue Yuan slowly raises his eyes, gazing intensely at him. The Abbot asks the question a third time.

Several years previously, during the rebellions at the end of the Sui dynasty, the warlord Wang Shichong rules from Luoyang and has treacherously installed himself as Emperor of the East Capitol. He is overseeing the bolstering of his riverfront defenses against the rival warlords on the opposite bank, close to the Shaolin Temple. The work of the slaves is not fast enough for him, so he orders his prisoners, who are opposing rebels, to join the slaves. These rebels include an older kung fu master and his son, Jue Yuan.

One day, after defending another prisoner, Jue Yuan's father draws the attention of the Emperor, who attacks him and personally kills him. Jue Yuan attempts revenge, but the Emperor seriously injures him, forcing Jue Yuan to escape to the Shaolin Temple. The Sifu (Yu Hai) is teaching the monks kung fu when Jue Yuan arrives. The Abbot proclaims that it is their holy duty as Buddhist monks to provide aid. The Sifu and his pupils nurse Jue Yuan back to health. After he recovers, Jue Yuan joins the monks in carrying water from the river to the temple, which is kung fu conditioning. He struggles, but is helped by a beautiful shepherd girl named Bai Wu Xia (Ding Lan), who is skilled at kung fu.

Jue Yuan befriends the fun-loving Sifu and his equally mischievous students. Jue Yuan learns that the Sifu is Bai Wu Xia's father and that nine years previously they fled the Emperor's soldiers, reaching the Shaolin Temple. Jue Yuan declares that he will kill the Emperor, and he asks the Sifu to train him in Northern Shaolin kung fu. The Sifu tells him that Shaolin kung fu is for defense, not killing, and that Jue Yuan isn't a monk. Jue Yuan says that he wants to become a monk.

Jue Yuan's head is shaven, and the Abbot ordains him as a junior monk. Jue Yuan begins Northern Shaolin kung fu training. After a time, he has gained impressive fighting abilities, but while sparring, he pictures the Emperor and nearly kills his partner. He is banned from practicing kung fu and runs away from the Shaolin Temple. Jue Yuan attempts to assassinate the Emperor, but fails and is forced to flee. Ashamed, he returns to the Shaolin Temple. His Sifu allows him to resume his Northern Shaolin kung fu training. Jue Yuan trains for more than a year, and becomes highly adept at Northern Shaolin kung fu.

One day, Li Shimin (son of Li Yuan) who is pursued by the Emperor enters Shaolin. The Shaolin monks make a show of helping the Emperor hunt for Li Shimin so he can escape. Jue Yuan and Bai Wu Xia help Li Shimin, making their way past the Emperor's patrols in disguise. A forbidden romance builds between Jue Yuan and Bai Wu Xia. The escape fails. Bai Wu Xia and an injured Li Shimin flee on a raft down the river, while Jue Yuan sacrifices himself to protect them. His Sifu and a group of Shaolin warrior monks come to his aid, saving Jue Yuan's life, but the Sifu banishes him from Shaolin. The Emperor learns what the Shaolin monks did, and marches on the Shaolin Temple with his army to destroy it.

The Abbot orders the monks not to fight, even as the Emperor's army surrounds the Shaolin Temple. The Abbot pleads with the Emperor for mercy and accepts the blame. He is placed on a pyre, which is set aflame. The Emperor tells the monks that if they reveal the traitors' whereabouts, he'll spare the Temple and the Abbot. He then has his men kill several of the other top monks. The Sifu and the warrior monks reveal themselves. The battle begins, and many monks are killed.

Jue Yuan and Ba Wu Xia return to the Shaolin Temple. The Emperor's army takes the outer walls and outer grounds, and kills all the monks there. The surviving monks fall back within the inner walls. The Sifu is wounded. He entreats Jue Yuan to protect Shaolin and uphold justice, and dies. The Emperor receives word that Li Shimin and his army are approaching his own East Capital, and they abandon the siege of the Shaolin Temple and ride for the East Capital instead. Jue Yuan and the warrior monks ride after the Emperor, joining the battle at the ravaged East Capital, the very site where the Emperor killed Jue Yuan's father. Jue Yuan and the Emperor duel on the shore of the great river. Jue Yuan kills the Emperor, and the battle for the East Capital is won.

Later, Jue Yuan has returned to Shaolin Temple, where the new Abbot asks him if he can obey the vow to not murder. Jue Yuan vows that he will not kill save to uphold righteousness, and the Abbot accepts this. Jue Yuan continues to swear his vows, but when he reaches the vow of celibacy, he is again conflicted. He opens his folded palms to look at a jade amulet, recalling how Bai Wu Xia gave it to him as a token of her love. He looks up to see Bai Wu Xia, who has sneaked into the side wing of the sanctum and is staring at him. He hesitates, then vows to remain celibate, and she leaves. Jue Yuan is ordained as a true monk of Shaolin. Jue Yuan also becomes the kung fu Sifu of the Shaolin Temple, leading the monks in their training.

Cast
 Jet Li as Jue Yuan
 Ding Lan as Bai Wu Xia
 Yu Hai as Sifu
 Hu Jianqiang as Wu Kong
 Jian-kui Sun as Se Kong
 Liu Huailiang as Liao Kong
 Wang Jue as Ban Kong
 Du Chuanyang as Wei Kong
 Cui Zhiqiang as Xuan Kong
 Xun Feng as Dao Kong
 Pan Hanguang as Zhi Cao
 Fan Ping as Hui Neng
 Jiang Hongbo as Hui Yin
 Shan Qi Bo Tong as Hui Yang
 Zhang Jianwen as Fang Zhang
 Yang Dihua as Seng Zhi
 Wang Guangkuan as Li Shimin
 Yu Chenghui as Wang Renze (Wang Shichong's nephew)
 Ji Chunhua as Tu Ying
 Pan Qingfu as First General
 Su Fei as Second General
 Chen Guo'an as Third General
 Bian Lichang as Fourth General
 Wang Guoyi as Fifth General
 Kong Fanyan as Sixth General
 Sun Shengjun as Seventh General
 Yan Dihua as Shaolin Senior Monk
 Hung Yan-yan as Shaolin student

Production

Box office
In China, it became the highest-grossing film of all time, grossing . The film reportedly sold more than  tickets across China within its first six months of release, eventually selling an estimated total of  tickets in China.

In Hong Kong, the film sold 700,000 tickets, and grossed , making it the fourth top-grossing film of 1982 in Hong Kong. It became the highest-grossing film of all time in Singapore with a gross of S$1.7 million.

In South Korea, the film sold 294,065 tickets in Seoul alone and set a box office record of  grossed nationwide in 1983.

Adjusted for inflation at  Chinese ticket prices in 2017, the film's adjusted gross revenue in China is estimated to be in the tens of billions of Chinese yuan (billions of US dollars) in 2017.

Accolades
 2nd Hong Kong Film Awards
 Nomination: Best Action Direction (Yue Hoi, Ma Xianda, Pan Qingfu, Wong Seung-hoi)

Legacy
The film was largely responsible for turning the Shaolin Monastery into a major tourist destination, both within China and internationally. The movie's popularity swiftly encouraged filmmakers in China and Hong Kong to produce more Shaolin-based movies.

The film spawned a revival of popularity in mainstream martial arts in China.

Series
The film spawned the Shaolin Temple series. Its sequel Shaolin Temple 2: Kids from Shaolin was released in 1984 and stars Jet Li in the lead role again. It sold an estimated  tickets at the Chinese box office, making it 1984's highest-grossing film in China. The first two Shaolin Temple films combined sold an estimated  tickets at the Chinese box office.

Shaolin Temple 3: Martial Arts of Shaolin was released in 1986 and also stars Jet Li in the lead role. A remake of the original film, The New Shaolin Temple, released in 2011, stars Andy Lau, Nicholas Tse and Jackie Chan.

In 2014, a 3D remake was announced to be in development, with director Justin Lin and produced by Beijing Enlight Pictures.

See also
 List of films by box office admissions
 List of highest-grossing films in China
 List of highest-grossing non-English films

References

External links
 
 
 Shaolin Temple at Hong Kong Cinemagic

1982 films
1980s Mandarin-language films
1982 comedy films
1982 martial arts films
1980s action comedy films
Chinese action comedy films
Films set in 7th-century Tang dynasty
Hong Kong action comedy films
Hong Kong martial arts comedy films
Kung fu films
Chinese martial arts comedy films
Shaolin Temple in film
Wushu films
1980s Hong Kong films